Ed & Red's Night Party (formerly called Ed's Night Party and sometimes referred to simply as Ed the Sock) is a former Canadian talk variety show. It was hosted by Steven Joel Kerzner as Ed the Sock and Kerzner's real-life wife Liana K. Other people who worked on the show included DJ James Stamos and comedian Ron Sparks. To date, it is the longest running Canadian late night talk show in history.

History 
Originally produced by Rogers Television in Toronto (the same television entity that developed The Tom Green Show in Ottawa), the series was syndicated across Canada in the early 1990s. Ed's profile was raised even higher with a series of specials and appearances on the national music video channel MuchMusic. The series was taken off the air in Alberta and other parts of the country after the show aired a comedy sequence in which Ed is shown supposedly having sex with a Playboy playmate, even though the program was being broadcast in a late night time slot.

In addition to its record-breaking run in Canada, the show briefly ran on G4 in the United States as part of their Midnight Spank late night television programming block. The show was also carried on the Ripe TV on-demand service. The show was retired with its final episode airing on CITY-TV on August 31, 2008. In Australia the show is seen on Fuel TV, where it is known as Ed the Sock.

Legacy 
After the shows cancellation, both Ed the Sock, Liana Kerzner, and Ron Sparks would later return together on a different show produced by CHCH-TV Hamilton called This Movie Sucks!, where the three pick on bad movies.

Co-hosts
Eric Tunney
Howard Glassman (Humble Howard)
Craig Campbell

See also 

This Movie Sucks!
Ed's Nite In

References

External links
 Ed the Sock website
 IMDb profile while under the name Ed's Night Party
 

1990s Canadian television talk shows
Citytv original programming
Canadian community channel television shows
Canadian television shows featuring puppetry
Rogers TV original programming
Ed the Sock
Canadian late-night television programming
2000s Canadian television talk shows